Rhys Oakley (born 16 September 1980 in Plymouth) is a rugby union footballer who has represented the Wales National Rugby Team, currently playing for Hartpury College R.F.C., who play in the English Championship. His usual position is at number eight .

Oakley played in the Premiership for Bristol Shoguns, where he made 19 starts for the club. Following Bristol's relegation from the top-flight in 2003, he joined Newport Gwent Dragons and made 50 appearances for Newport.

Oakley attained two Welsh caps in August 2003, making his debut for  against  in the World Cup warm-up games in the back row alongside former Tyke Richard Parks.

He also appeared for Wales in the Commonwealth Games in Melbourne in 2006 (15–26 March), being part of the squad who won the Plate competition in Sevens Rugby .

Oakley joined the Tykes from Newport on a two-year deal, along with Newport teammate Leigh Hinton, for the start of the National Division One 2006–07 season, making his debut against London Welsh at Headingley on 3 September 2006.

Tykes, then director of rugby Stuart Lancaster said at the time: "Rhys is a very talented young back-rower who will add a great deal to our squad.

"I was surprised that he was released by the Dragons but am delighted to have secured his services.

"I was impressed by his desire to be part of a new team and his drive to reach the top. He is a versatile player who can play anywhere in the back row and he will give us strength in depth going forward."

External links
Leeds profile
Newport Gwent Dragons profile

1980 births
Living people
Bristol Bears players
British expatriates in France
Commonwealth Games rugby sevens players of Wales
CS Bourgoin-Jallieu players
Dragons RFC players
Expatriate rugby union players in France
Leeds Tykes players
Rugby sevens players at the 2006 Commonwealth Games
Rugby union players from Plymouth, Devon
Wales international rugby union players
Welsh expatriate rugby union players
Welsh rugby union players